Roy Cullinan (23 December 1932 – 4 May 1996) was an  Australian rules footballer who played with South Melbourne in the Victorian Football League (VFL).

Notes

External links 

1932 births
1996 deaths
Australian rules footballers from Victoria (Australia)
Sydney Swans players
Spotswood Football Club players